The Pigeon That Took Rome is a 1962 American comedy war film directed and written by Melville Shavelson and starring Charlton Heston. The film is set in the Italian Campaign of World War II and was based on the 1961 novel The Easter Dinner by former spy Donald Downes.

Plot
In 1944, during the last stages of the war in Europe, American officers Paul MacDougall (Heston) and Joseph Angelico (Guardino) are sent to Rome to act as spies for the Allies, even though they have no experience in espionage. Working with Italian partisan soldier Ciccio Massimo (Baccaloni), MacDougall and Contini send regular reports to their superiors by carrier pigeon.

Angelico also finds himself falling in love with Massimo's pregnant daughter Rosalba (Pallotta), while her sister Antonella (Martinelli) has her eye on MacDougall. Angelico proposes to Rosalba, and Ciccio prepares a feast to celebrate his daughter's upcoming wedding. However, Ciccio prepares squab for the occasion, killing all but one of the carrier pigeons. Ciccio scrambles to replace them, but the new pigeons he finds are German, and they deliver MacDougall's and Angelico's messages directly into enemy hands, creating new confusion.

Cast
Charlton Heston - Captain Paul MacDougall, Benny the Snatch and Narrator
Elsa Martinelli - Antonella Massimo
Harry Guardino - Sgt. Joseph Angelico
Salvatore Baccaloni - Ciccio Massimo
Carlo Angeletti ("Marietto") - Livio Massimo
Gabriella Pallotta - Rosalba Massimo
Brian Donlevy - Col. Sherman Harrington
Arthur Shields - Monsignor O'Toole
Rudolph Anders - Col. Wilhelm Krafft
Vadim Wolkowsky - Conte Danesi

Awards and nominations
 Academy Awards
Best Art Direction-Set Decoration, Black-and-White (Hal Pereira, Roland Anderson, Samuel M. Comer, Frank R. McKelvy) (nominated) 

 Golden Globe Awards
Best Motion Picture Actor - Musical/Comedy (Charlton Heston, nominated)
Best Supporting Actor (Harry Guardino, nominated)
Best Supporting Actress (Gabriella Pallotta, nominated)

 Writers Guild of America
Best Written American Comedy (Melville Shavelson, nominated)

See also
 List of American films of 1962
War pigeon

References

External links

1962 films
1960s spy comedy films
American spy comedy films
American black-and-white films
Films based on American novels
Films directed by Melville Shavelson
American war comedy films
Films set in 1944
Italian Campaign of World War II films
Military humor in film
Paramount Pictures films
World War II spy films
Films set in Rome
1962 comedy films
Films scored by Alessandro Cicognini
1960s English-language films
1960s American films